Gwernyfed High School is a high school in the village of Three Cocks, Brecon, Powys, Wales

It first opened as a school in 1950, previously being open as a munitions factory during World War 2. It currently has around 500 pupils. Part of the school is a Grade II listed Victorian mansion house, Gwernyfed Park. There is a modern block which also accommodates classrooms and a drama studio. There is a building commissioned in 2008 which provides a dining hall and sports facilities. There  are several acres of sports fields including rugby pitches, football and hockey pitches, athletics track, hardcourts and astro pitches. The grounds include listed rose gardens, orchards, pond and wildlife area and a stream.

Notes 

Secondary schools in Powys
Educational institutions established in 1950
1950 establishments in Wales
Grade II* listed buildings in Powys